The 2006 IIHF World Championship Division II was an international Ice hockey tournament run by the International Ice Hockey Federation.  The tournament was contested from March 27 to April 9, 2006. Participants in this tournament were separated into two separate tournament groups. The Group A tournament was contested in Sofia, Bulgaria. Group B's games were played in Auckland, New Zealand. Romania and China finished atop of Group A and Group B respectively, gaining promotion to Division I for 2007. While South Africa finished last in Group A and hosts New Zealand last in Group B and were relegated to Division III for 2007.

Participants

Group A

Group B

Group A tournament

Fixtures
All times local.

Ranking and statistics

Scoring leaders
List shows the top skaters sorted by points, then goals. If the list exceeds 10 skaters because of a tie in points, all of the tied skaters are left out.
GP = Games played; G = Goals; A = Assists; Pts = Points; +/− = Plus/minus; PIM = Penalties in minutes; POS = PositionSource: IIHF.com

Leading goaltenders
Only the top five goaltenders, based on save percentage, who have played 40% of their team's minutes are included in this list.
TOI = Time On Ice (minutes:seconds); SA = Shots against; GA = Goals against; GAA = Goals against average; Sv% = Save percentage; SO = ShutoutsSource: IIHF.com

Group B tournament

Fixtures
All times local.

Ranking and statistics

GP = Games played; W = Wins; T = Ties;L = Losses; GF = Goals for; GA = Goals against; GDF = Goal difference; PTS = Points

Scoring leaders
List shows the top skaters sorted by points, then goals. If the list exceeds 10 skaters because of a tie in points, all of the tied skaters are left out.
GP = Games played; G = Goals; A = Assists; Pts = Points; +/− = Plus/minus; PIM = Penalties in minutes; POS = PositionSource: IIHF.com

Leading goaltenders
Only the top five goaltenders, based on save percentage, who have played 40% of their team's minutes are included in this list.
TOI = Time On Ice (minutes:seconds); SA = Shots against; GA = Goals against; GAA = Goals against average; Sv% = Save percentage; SO = ShutoutsSource: IIHF.com

References

IIHF World Championship Division II
3
Iihf World Championship Division Ii, 2006
2006
Iihf World Championship Division Ii, 2006
2006